Austin, Michigan may refer to the following places in the U.S. state of Michigan:

 Austin, Hillsdale County, Michigan, an unincorporated community in Amboy Township
 Austin, Kalamazoo County, Michigan, a former community now within the city of Portage
 Austin, Marquette County, Michigan, an unincorporated community near Gwinn
 Austin, Oakland County, Michigan, a former post office in Groveland Township

See also 
 Austin Township, Mecosta County, Michigan
 Austin Township, Sanilac County, Michigan
 Port Austin Township, Michigan, in Huron County